Amity School District 4J is a rural public school district located in Yamhill County, Oregon. The district contains 4 schools and serves the residents of Amity and surrounding areas.

Demographics

Students 
District student enrollment by race is
1% American Indian/Alaska Native
1% Asian
<1% Black/African American
13% Hispanic/Latino
5% declared Multiracial
<1% Native Hawaiian/Pacific Islander
80% White

Teachers 
District staff employment by race is
2% Asian
3% declared Multiracial
2% Native Hawaiian/Pacific Islander
93% White

References

External links 
At-A-Glance School and District Profiles - Oregon Department of Education

School districts in Oregon